Maria Teresa "Tessa" Cruz San Diego is a prolific and bestselling author of Tagalog popular romance novels in the Philippines.  As a writer for the Tagalog pocketbooks industry, San Diego used the pen names such as Maia Jose and Tisha Nicole.

Career
San Diego's first Tagalog romance novel was published in 1992 by Books for Pleasure, Inc. under the Valentine Romances line of paperbacks. San Diego's romantic novels included plots that are within the scope of fantasy romance and issues that are political, ecological, and gender-related.  San Diego has already written around a hundred Tagalog romance novels in a span of two decades  Apart from writing romances, San Diego was a mentor and trainer for the Basic Film Scriptwriting course sponsored by Star Cinema. San Diego also freelances as writer and editor for non-governmental organizations in the Philippines and abroad.

See also
Armine Rhea Mendoza
Lualhati Bautista
Edgardo Reyes
Babes Cajayon

References

External links
Maia Jose: Writer, Filipina, Published Author of Philippine/Filipino/Tagalog Romance Novels Since 1992, a video interview on writing Filipino romance novels

Living people
Year of birth missing (living people)
Tagalog-language writers
Filipino women novelists
20th-century Filipino writers
21st-century Filipino writers
20th-century Filipino women writers
21st-century Filipino women writers
20th-century pseudonymous writers
21st-century pseudonymous writers
Pseudonymous women writers
Filipino romantic fiction writers
Women romantic fiction writers